I Spy is a 1934 British film. Ben Lyon made it at the same time as his wife, Bebe Daniels, was making a film at the same studio, BIP. It was the first British film for both Lyon and Sally Eilers.

Cast
Ben Lyon
Sally Eilers

References

External links

I Spy at Letterbox DVD
I Spy at BFI

1934 films
British comedy-drama films
Films shot at British International Pictures Studios
1930s British films